David Powell may refer to:

 Dai Powell (David Morgan Powell, born 1935), Welsh footballer, full back for Blackpool and Rochdale
 Dave Powell (1876–1953), Australian rules footballer who played with South Melbourne
 David Powell (actor) (1883–1925), Scottish born stage and film actor of the silent era
 David Powell (footballer, born 1944), Welsh former footballer
 David Powell (footballer, born 1967), English former footballer
 David Powell (rugby union) (born 1942), former England international rugby union player
 David Powell (table tennis) (born 1991), Australian table tennis player
 David Franklin Powell ("White Beaver"), showman, patent-medicine maker and Wisconsin politician
 David Thomas Powell (c. 1772–1848), English clergyman and antiquary

 Dewi Nantbrân (David Powell, died 1781), Welsh Franciscan

See also
 David Powel (1549/52–1598), Welsh Church of England clergyman and historian